Aderpas nyassicus is a species of beetle in the family Cerambycidae. It was described by Stephan von Breuning in 1935.

References

Aderpasini
Beetles described in 1935
Taxa named by Stephan von Breuning (entomologist)